Halfway to a Threeway is an EP by American musician Jim O'Rourke.  It was released by Drag City in 1999.

The EP is referenced in the song "Will Get Fooled Again," by Max Tundra, from his album Parallax Error Beheads You.

Critical reception
Exclaim! called the EP "one of Jim O'Rourke's true crowning achievements," writing that it "shows the 'Chicago sound' at the height of its powers." The Independent called the title track "a gorgeous, wistful lullaby."

Track listing

Track 3 features backing vocals by Sam Prekop and Archer Prewitt of The Sea and Cake.

Personnel
Main personnel
 Jim O'Rourke – vocals, guitars; piano (#1-3), organ (#2), percussion (#1-2)
 Glenn Kotche – drums (#1,3)
 Darin Gray, bass guitar (#1,2,3)
 Frank Navin, vocals (#1)
 Rob Mazurek – cornet (#2,3)
 Tim Barnes, drums (#2)
 Archer Prewitt – vocals (#3)
 Sam Prekop – vocals (#3)

Technical personnel
 Jeremy Lemos – assistant engineer, recording
 Konrad Strauss – mastering
 Jim Newberry – photography

References

1999 EPs
Jim O'Rourke (musician) albums
Drag City (record label) EPs
Domino Recording Company EPs